Asthenotoma meneghinii is an extinct species of sea snail, a marine gastropod mollusk in the family Borsoniidae.

Description

Distribution
This extinct marine species occurs in the Tortonian strata of the Upper Miocene near Sassuolo in the Northern Apennines, Italy

References

 Mayer, C. 1868. Description de coquilles fossiles des terrains tertiaires superieurs (suite). Journal de Conchyliogie. 16: 102–113. 
 Gatto, R  (1993), Pleurotoma meneghinii Mayer, 1868 (currently Asthenotoma meneghinii; Mollusca, Gastropoda): proposed replacement of neotype by rediscovered lectotype; Bulletin of Zoological Nomenclature 50 pp. 209–211

Asthenotoma
Gastropods described in 1868